All the Winners is a 1920 British silent sports film directed by Geoffrey Malins and starring Owen Nares, Maudie Dunham and Sam Livesey. It is set in the horse racing world.

It was made at Isleworth Studios.

Cast
 Owen Nares as Tim Hawker  
 Maudie Dunham as Dora Dalton  
 Sam Livesey as Pedro Darondary  
 Maidie Hope as Picco  
 Ena Beaumont as Daphne Dression

References

Bibliography
 Harris, Ed. Britain's Forgotten Film Factory: The Story of Isleworth Studios. Amberley Publishing, 2012.

External links

1920 films
1920s sports films
British horse racing films
British silent feature films
Films directed by Geoffrey Malins
Films set in England
Films shot at Isleworth Studios
Films based on British novels
British black-and-white films
1920s English-language films
1920s British films
Silent sports films